This article lists orbital and suborbital launches during the second half of the year 2021, including launches planned for 2021 without a specific launch date.

For all other spaceflight activities, see 2021 in spaceflight. For launches in the first half of 2021, see List of spaceflight launches in January–June 2021. For launches in 2022, see List of spaceflight launches in January–June 2022.



Orbital launches 

|colspan=8 style="background:white;"|

July 
|-

|colspan=8 style="background:white;"|

August 
|-

|colspan=8 style="background:white;"|

September 
|-

|colspan=8 style="background:white;"|

October 
|-

|colspan=8 style="background:white;"|

November 
|-

|colspan=8 style="background:white;"|

December 
|-

|}

Suborbital flights 

|}

Notes

References

External links

2021 in spaceflight
Spaceflight by year
Spaceflight